William John Hughes (October 17, 1932 – October 30, 2019) was an American politician and diplomat who served as a Democratic member of the U.S. House of Representatives from 1975 to 1995, representing New Jersey's Second Congressional District  which includes major portions of the Jersey Shore and Pine Barrens,  the cities of Vineland and Atlantic City, and the  counties of Salem, Cumberland, Atlantic, Cape May and part of Gloucester.  After retiring from Congress in 1995, Hughes was appointed by President Bill Clinton as United States Ambassador to Panama, a post he held  until October, 1998 leading up to the historic turnover of the Panama Canal to Panamanian control.

During his tenure in Congress, Hughes was a member of the House Judiciary Committee, where he chaired the Subcommittee on Crime (1981–1990) and the Subcommittee on Intellectual Property and Judicial Administration (1991–1994).  Hughes also served on the House Committee on Merchant Marine and Fisheries, which had jurisdiction over numerous issues of importance to his coastal district.  Hughes was one of the managers appointed by the House of Representatives in 1986 to conduct impeachment proceedings against District Court Judge Harry E. Claiborne of Nevada.  Before being elected to Congress, Hughes served for 10 years as First Assistant Prosecutor in Cape May County 1960-70.  His Congressional Papers are housed at the Rutgers University Libraries Special Collections and University Archives.

Personal history
Hughes was born in Salem, New Jersey, the son of Pauline Mehaffey and William W. Hughes. He graduated from Penns Grove High School in 1950. He attended Rutgers University, graduating in 1955 and earned his law degree from Rutgers Law School in 1958.  He was admitted to the New Jersey bar in 1959 and commenced practice in Ocean City; served as township solicitor for Upper Township, 1959–1961; appointed assistant prosecutor for Cape May County in 1960; reappointed as first assistant prosecutor in 1961 and served until the spring of 1970; appointed by the New Jersey Supreme Court to the Advisory Committee on Professional Ethics, 1972. Prior to his election to Congress in 1974, Hughes was President of the law firm of Loveland, Hughes and Garrett in Ocean City. Hughes was married  to the former Nancy L. Gibson of Moorestown from 1956 until her death in 2018. The couple had four children.

Following his return from Panama, Hughes taught for several years at Stockton State College in Pomona, New Jersey. His work at Stockton led to the founding of a Public Policy Center which in 2008 was named the William J. Hughes Center for Public Policy. Hughes also received honorary degrees from Rutgers University, Glassboro State (now Rowan University), Stockton College, Mount Vernon College for Women, Cumberland County College and Atlantic Cape Community College.  In 1997, he was inducted into the Rutgers Hall of Distinguished Alumni.

Hughes was a longtime resident of Ocean City, where he died on October 30, 2019, at age 87.

United States House of Representatives
Hughes served in the United States House of Representatives from 1975 until 1995.

Crime Subcommittee

During his tenure in Congress, Hughes served as a member of the House Judiciary Committee, where he chaired the Subcommittee on Crime (1981–1990).  During that time, Hughes sponsored numerous anti-crime bills that became law including, three that became the government's principal weapons in the war against drugs and other illegal activity.  They are:

 The Comprehensive Drug Penalties Act  (H.R. 4901)  gave the courts significant new authority to order the seizure of boats, airplanes, cars, real estate, cash and other assets acquired by drug dealers through their criminal activities, thus enabling the government to  seize billions of dollars in ill-gotten gain.  According to Alice S. Fisher, Assistant Attorney General for the U.S. Department of Justice Criminal Division:  "[Asset forfeiture] has become a vital weapon in the United States' anti-crime arsenal to strip criminals of their illicit wealth…. The Asset Forfeiture Program has forfeited more than $2 billion during the past two years—and is in the process of returning nearly $700 million to victims of crime in FY 2007 alone."
  Money Laundering Penalties Act  (H.R. 6031) prohibits the transport of drug-related funds out of the country and makes it more  difficult for drug dealers to keep and use the proceeds of their crimes, and
 The Chemical Diversion and Trafficking Act of 1988 enabled the Federal Government to regulate listed chemicals used in the clandestine synthesis of dangerous drugs.

In addition to the foregoing, under Hughes' chairmanship, the Crime Subcommittee also produced a number of other significant initiatives including
the Major Fraud Act of 1988, the Child Sexual Abuse and Pornography Act, the Antiterrorism Act, the Computer Fraud and Abuse Act , the Federal Anti-Tampering Act which authorized the federal government to investigate incidents involving tampering with drugs or consumer products and imposed criminal penalties for such acts, the Justice Assistance Act (H.R. 2175) which provided federal matching grants to state and local governments to carry out innovative and effective anti-crime programs, the Contract Services for Drug Dependent Federal Offenders Authorization Act of 1983 (H.R. 2173) which authorized funds to monitor and test federal drug offenders to keep them from going back to drugs, the Anti-Arson Act of 1982 (H.R. 6454) which expanded federal jurisdiction to include all major interstate arson cases, the Convention on the Physical Protection of Nuclear Material Implementation Act of 1982 (H.R. 5228) which imposed fines and prison terms for the illegal diversion or use of nuclear materials and authorized improved nuclear safeguards, the Pretrial Services Act (H.R. 3481) which implemented a nationwide system to provide judges with better information about defendants before setting bail, and for monitoring defendants awaiting trial, the Dangerous Drug Diversion Control Act of 1984 (H.R. 5656) which strengthened federal authority to prevent the diversion of legal prescription drugs into the illicit market, the Computer Trespass Act of 1984 (H.R. 5616) which provided criminal penalties for counterfeiting access devices and for the illegal entry into federal interest computers, and the Trademark Counterfeiting Act (H.R. 6071) which strengthened federal laws against the counterfeiting of trademarked products.

Firearms related issues
Because the Subcommittee on Crime had jurisdiction over Federal firearms laws as well as the Bureau of Alcohol, Tobacco, Firearms and Explosives, Hughes was involved in a number of gun-related issues during his chairmanship.  These include:

 Undetectable Firearms Act of 1988 (H.R. 4445) – Amended the Federal criminal code to make it unlawful to manufacture, import, sell, ship, deliver, possess, transfer, or receive any firearm which is not as detectable by walk-through metal detectors or which has major components that do not generate an accurate image when subjected to inspection by airport x-ray machines. No such firearms actually exist. Signed into law by President Reagan November 10, 1988 (Public Law No: 100-649)
 Law Enforcement Officers Protection Act of 1985 (H.R. 3132) – Hughes was an original cosponsor of this legislation which prohibited the manufacture, importation and sale of ammunition designed to penetrate the bullet-resistant armor worn by police officers. Signed into law by President Reagan August 28, 1986 (Became Public Law No: 99-408)
 Career Criminals Amendments Act  (H.R. 4885) – Required mandatory 15-year prison sentences for the possession of a firearm by persons with three convictions for drug trafficking or violent crime offenses.  Signed into law by President Reagan October 27, 1986.
 Armed Career Criminals Act (H.R. 6248) – Hughes was a cosponsor of this legislation reported from the Crime Subcommittee, which amends the Omnibus Crime Control and Safe Streets Act of 1968 to establish a mandatory sentence of 15 years and a fine of not more than $25,000 for persons possessing a firearm with three or more felony convictions during the commission of a burglary or robbery.  Signed into law by President Reagan October 12, 1984.
 Firearm Owners Protection Act of 1986 (H.R. 4332)  – Reformed the 1968 Gun Control Act to eliminate red tape for gun owners and gun dealers, strengthened law enforcement, and increased penalties for the use of a firearm or silencer in a violent crime or drug trafficking offense (signed into law by President Reagan on July 8, 1986).  This legislation also included the Hughes Amendment that prohibited civilian private possession of fully automatic firearms manufactured after May 19, 1986.  The passage of the ban on fully automatic firearms has been controversial with many gun rights advocates.

Environment

Ocean dumping, shore protection and marine pollution

As a member of the House Committee on Merchant Marine and Fisheries, Hughes became deeply involved in ocean protection and environmental legislation. Hughes also served on the House Select Committee on the Outer Continental Shelf (OCS), an important assignment because the ocean waters off the coast of New Jersey and other mid-Atlantic states have often been looked to as future potential oil drilling sites.

In 1970, the President's Council on Environmental Quality issued a landmark report concluding that ocean dumping and other forms of marine pollution had resulted in serious environmental damage and posed a threat to human health. The report found that marine pollution had forced the closure of at least one-fifth of the Nation's commercial shellfish beds, beaches and bays had been closed to swimming and heavy fish kills had occurred. New York dumpers accounted for more than half of the 5.5 million tons dumped annually in the Bight and Northern N.J. dumpers accounted for 34 percent.

In 1975, Hughes successfully offered the amendment for which he is perhaps best known, which banned the dumping of harmful sewage sludge and chemicals in the ocean after December 31, 1981.  The bill was signed into law by President Carter in November, 1977.  Although the sludge dumping ban was opposed by Congressman John M. Murphy of New York, who was Chairman of the Merchant Marine and Fisheries Committee, Hughes was successful in getting enough votes in the Committee to defeat legislative efforts to delay the effective date.  Under this law, more than 300 industries and municipalities, including New York City and Philadelphia, which had permits or were seeking permits to dump their wastes in the ocean, were required to switch to land-based disposal alternatives.

In 1981, New York City and several other municipalities sued the EPA and were successful in obtaining a court ruling that ocean dumping of sewage sludge could not be banned without full consideration of the costs and environmental consequences of alternative disposal methods.  EPA did not appeal the court's ruling and, as a result, ocean dumping was allowed to continue.  Congress subsequently passed legislation to extend the deadline, to allow more time for the U.S. Environmental Protection Agency to study the impact of ocean dumping and identify acceptable disposal alternatives.  In 1984, the EPA closed the long-time New York Bight ocean dumping site and designated a  site as its replacement.  Nine municipal sewerage authorities, including New York City, began dumping their sludge at the  site in 1986.

Hughes responded by writing new legislation to ban the ocean dumping of harmful sewage sludge and chemicals which was enacted into law in 1988, and which banned ocean dumping after December 31, 1991.  New York City missed the deadline by a few months, but ultimately became the last municipality to comply with the law, getting out of the ocean on June 30, 1992.  It took 17 years, but Hughes finally prevailed in his effort to ban the dumping of harmful sewage sludge and chemicals in the ocean.

In addition to his work on ocean dumping of sewage sludge, Hughes also advocated a number of measures to reduce marine pollution from other sources including measures to ban the disposal of plastic debris and medical wastes at sea.  Hughes authored  H.R. 5225, the Health Waste Anti-Dumping Act of 1988 , which passed the House of Representatives in September 1988, and also sponsored or cosponsored several other bills on medical waste which either became law or had provisions that were ultimately included in S. 2030, the Ocean Dumping Ban Act of 1988.   He also championed several measures to prevent the disposal of plastic debris in the ocean, culminating in the enactment of the Marine Plastic Pollution Research and Control Act of 1987 as part of the  United States-Japan Fishery Agreement Approval Act of 1987 .

Hughes won approval of numerous measures over the years to help maintain and protect South Jersey's many miles of beaches and inland waterways, which provide significant support for the local economy.  Hughes sponsored and helped fund a long-awaited project in Cape May to rebuild the beach and protect the U.S. Coast Guard Training Center from erosion.  Also, over his 20 years in Congress, Hughes worked to secure millions of additional dollars to dredge the Intracoastal Waterway and develop low-cost erosion control projects along the coastline.

New Jersey Pinelands

Although the New Jersey Pinelands is located in the most urbanized state in the Nation, it is the largest tract of open space on the mid-Atlantic Coast with one of the cleanest aquifers in the world.  To help protect the Pinelands' unique natural and cultural resources from encroaching development, in 1977 Hughes introduced H.R. 9539, the Pinelands Preservation Act.  Hughes subsequently joined with Senators Harrison A. Williams and Clifford P. Case, and Reps. Edwin B. Forsythe and James Florio in coauthoring a historic law enacted in 1978 which established the Pinelands National Reserve in New Jersey.  The federal law was followed by subsequent enactment of N.J. State legislation creating the New Jersey Pinelands Commission to manage and protect the resources of nearly a million acres (4,000 km²) of the Pinelands.

Aging and other activities

Hughes also served on the House Select Committee on Aging, which he chaired in 1993, the Select Committee on Narcotics Abuse and Control, and  the House Select Committee on the Outer Continental Shelf (OCS).

In 1986, Hughes  was one of the House impeachment managers who prosecuted the case in the impeachment trial of Judge Harry E. Claiborne. Claiborne was found guilty by the United States Senate and removed from his federal judgeship.

U.S. Ambassador to Panama

Bill Hughes was nominated in early 1995 by President Bill Clinton to serve as U.S. Ambassador to Panama.  He was confirmed by the U.S. Senate on September 29, 1995,
and presented his credentials to President Ernesto Pérez Balladares in early November 1995.  When he began his tour in 1995, Panama had become a major transit country for drugs mostly cocaine coming from South America, and money laundering was also a major problem.  Panama has been viewed as "ideally positioned for illicit financial transactions and drug smuggling."

As the Ambassador to Panama, Hughes was responsible for an Embassy of about 425 employees and 21 agencies, including a sizable law enforcement and intelligence component.  The United States Southern Command was then based in Panama, so one of Hughes' major functions was to coordinate with the U.S. military.  Most of the counter-narcotics missions were directed out of Howard Air Force Base in Panama.  From the Multi-national Counter Narcotics Center (MCNC) at Howard, AWAC and other equipment was deployed into South America.  The 177th Fighter Wing, based in Pomona, N.J. rotated out of Panama during his tour and provided air cover for the AWAC operations.

Hughes was also an ex officio member of the Panama Canal Commission and was charged with the responsibility of coordinating the work of the Commission with the Republic of Panama.  The central mission of the Commission as well as the Embassy was to lead a successful turnover of the Panama Canal in December 1999 and, as the principal U.S. representative in Panama, Hughes actively participated in the planning and execution process.  The military was also responsible for turning over about six remaining military facilities to the Republic of Panama, and Hughes was the lead civilian representing the U.S. government.  Between 1995 and 1998, most of the military facilities were turned over to Panama, including some of the more controversial properties such as the bombing ranges and target practice areas, where there was a presence of unexploded ordnance.  This required many trips to Washington and meetings with the Panama Foreign Ministry, with Hughes serving as the lead representative for the U.S.  In addition to his work overseeing the transfer of military bases and the coordination of the Canal and negotiation of transfer agreements, Hughes led the following efforts:

 Establishment of the first Financial Analysis Unit in the Southern Hemisphere
 Creation of a new initiative to combat alien smuggling, including an increase in the size of the U.S. Embassy to 21 agencies
 Passage of new laws patterned after those in the U.S. to set up an intellectual property regime in Panama, including the creation of a new enforcement unit to fight IP piracy.  Formal training was provided to the new unit as well as a public program to create an awareness of the damage caused by IP piracy
 Substantial increase in the size of the Coast Guard, acquisition of surplus boats from the U.S., and the creation of refueling and provisioning stations along the coast, including on the Colombian border
 Creation of a forfeiture law to seize drug assets, including money, airplanes, boats and vehicles.  By the time Hughes left Panama, the Coast Guard had seized about 10 vessels and was using them in the battle against the traffickers
 Development of a multi-force border control unit and a comprehensive strategy to combat smuggling at the border with Costa Rica.  Most of the contraband seized was destined for the U.S.
 Hughes also participated with the Southern Command, the State Department and others in an effort to negotiate new Treaty rights to advance the U.S.'s counter-narcotics strategy in the Southern Hemisphere.

Honorary regard
The FAA Technical Center in southern New Jersey was renamed to the William J. Hughes Technical Center in his honor. The Bill & Nancy Hughes Performing Arts Center in the Ocean City High School is named in honor of the community service and local contributions of Congressman Hughes and his wife, Nancy.  In Cape May, the beach known as Trenton Beach was renamed in perpetuity as The Congressman William J. Hughes Beach. Additionally, in 1995, the Borough of Penns Grove in Salem County renamed Church Street—the street where Hughes grew up—in his honor.  Hughes was named Congressman of the Year by the National Association of Police Organizations (1986).  He is a past recipient of the Book of Golden Deeds Award from the Exchange Club of Ocean City (1975), the Leo Fraser Super Achiever Award from the Juvenile Diabetes Foundation (1987), and the Arthur E. Armitage, Sr. Distinguished Alumni Award from Rutgers University (1988).

Election history
Prior to his appointment as Ambassador, Hughes served 10 terms in the U.S. House of Representatives, representing New Jersey's Second Congressional District longer than anyone in history.  He first ran for Congress in 1970 when he challenged incumbent Congressman Charles W. Sandman and lost by fewer than 5,000 votes.  Hughes did not run for office in 1972 but again sought election to Congress in 1974 and won with 57% of the vote as one of the so-called "Watergate Babies" who were swept into office in the wake of the Watergate Scandal and the resignation of President Richard Nixon.  In 1976, Hughes faced Assemblyman James R. Hurley of Millville in his first reelection bid and won with 62% of the vote.  In subsequent elections, Hughes' winning percentage averaged 60%.  During the 1984 election, Hughes outpolled President Reagan in his district by a margin of 63% to 62%.  He outpolled President Bush in 1988 by 66% to 58%, and outpolled President Clinton by 57% to 40%.

* Minor candidate notes: In 1980, Adele Frisch ran from the Socialist Labor party and garnered 939 votes (<1%). In 1992, Joseph Ponczek ran under the Anti-Tax party and had 2,067 votes (1%) cast for him; Andrea Lippi ran under the "Freedom, Equality, Prosperity" party and got 1,605 votes (1%).

See also
U.S. Congressional Delegations from New Jersey#United States House of Representatives

References

External links

William John Hughes at The Political Graveyard

1932 births
2019 deaths
20th-century American politicians
Ambassadors of the United States to Panama
American gun control activists
Democratic Party members of the United States House of Representatives from New Jersey
Penns Grove High School alumni
People from Ocean City, New Jersey
People from Salem, New Jersey
Rutgers School of Law–Camden alumni
Rutgers University alumni
Stockton University faculty
20th-century American Episcopalians
Candidates in the 1970 United States elections